The Bon Secour River is a stream in Baldwin County, Alabama in the United States. It empties into Bon Secour Bay at Mobile Bay.

See also
List of rivers of Alabama

References

Rivers of Alabama
Tributaries of Mobile Bay
Rivers of Baldwin County, Alabama